Justice West may refer to:

Charles S. West (1829–1885), associate justice of the Texas Supreme Court
Jesse F. West (1862–1929), associate justice of the Virginia Supreme Court of Appeals
Judson S. West (1855–1935), associate justice of the Kansas Supreme Court
Lee Roy West (1929–2020), Special justice of the Oklahoma Supreme Court
Thomas F. West (1874–1931), associate justice and chief justice of the Florida Supreme Court from 1917 to 1925
William H. West (judge) (1824–1911), associate justice of the Ohio Supreme Court 
William West (Rhode Island politician) (c. 1733–1816), associate justice of the Rhode Island Supreme Court